Daryacheh (also Romanized as Daryācheh) is a village in Eslamabad Rural District, in the Central District of Jiroft County, Kerman Province, Iran. At the 2006 census, its population was 777, in 163 families.

References 

Populated places in Jiroft County